An ice floe is a moving pack of rafts of ice.

Floe may also refer to:

Places
 Floe Peak, Kootenay National Park, British Columbia, Canada; a mountain in the Canadian Rockies
 Floe Lake, Kootenay National Park, British Columbia, Canada; a lake
 Floe, West Virginia, US; an unincorporated community in Clay County

People
 First Lady of Ethiopia (FLOE)
 Floé Kühnert (born 1984), German pole vaulter
 Edgar Allen Floe (born 1978), American hiphop artist

Fictional characters
 Floe, a character from the anime series Simoun

Other uses
 "Floe" , a movement from the 1981 Philip Glass composition Glassworks
 Southern Floe, a Southern-class whaler

See also

 Phloe, a 2015 album by Thaneth Warakulnukroh

 Flow (disambiguation)
 Flou (disambiguation)
 Floh (disambiguation)
 Flo (disambiguation)